Panzhihua, formerly Dukou, is a prefecture-level city located in the far south of Sichuan province, People's Republic of China, at the confluence of the Jinsha and Yalong Rivers.

Its economy relies almost entirely on its giant mine, one of the country's largest. The economy in Panzhihua is mainly centered on natural resource development, heavy-industry. Around the 1970s, immigrants from various parts of China flow into the city. The urban center was built on top of mountainous terrains. In 2005, Panzhihua won the "China Excellent Tourist City" title, in 2008 it won the "National Health City" and the "China Vanadium, Titanium" titles.

Geography and climate
The area has a monsoon-influenced humid subtropical climate (Köppen Cwa), with short, mild, dry winters and long, hot, and humid summers. Much of the annual rainfall occurs from June to September.

Hydrology
Panzhihua lies in the Yangtze River basin, holding more than 95 waterways. They feed the Jinsha and Yandalong Rivers, which in turn feed the Yangtze. Annual runoff volume is 110.2 billion cubic meters. The potential hydropower capacity is 700 million kilowatts. The installed capacity is 3.474 million kilowatts.

Geology
Panzhihua is close to the Xigeda-Yuanmou fracture in the Sichuan-Yunnan border. Its Renhe District was the epicenter of the 2008 Panzhihua earthquake.

Archaeology
Bronze Age cultural remains are representative of various types of bronze artifacts. Under the jurisdiction of Panzhihua City in Yanbian, Miyi and Renhe District, archeologists have collected nearly 20 bronze artifacts. Most of the dig sites were tomb sites excavated specifically for funerary objects. Practical objects were found that can be divided into three categories. Weapons such as bronze swords, bronze spears, and bronze Ge, tools such as copper axes, copper knives and copper hoes, and decorative objects like copper bracelets were found.

The objects were similar to those of western Yunnan province, reflecting ethnic group similarities. The relics date from the Warring States ~ Western Han period.

Tourism resources
The landscape is dominated by natural areas. Attractions include a red cell spa, the Cave Stone Forest, the Jinsha River and Hai lake.

Cycas forest
Cycas first appeared some 280 million years ago in the Permian period. They consist of some 110 species. In 1971, Sichuan Agricultural Science and the original forest vegetation Panzhihua aerial survey, found more than 100,000 specimens. It is the highest altitude Cycas forest, hosting the largest number and size of specimens. This forest consists of an endemic species, Cycas panzhihuaensis.

Ertan Hydropower Station
The Ertan Dam is an arch dam on the Yalong River, a tributary of the Yangtze River in Sichuan.

The dam has six hydroelectric generators, each with a generating capacity of 550 MW. The total generating capacity of the facility is 3,300 MW, one of the largest in China. Annual production averages 17 TWh, and through December 5, 2006, it produced over 100 TWh of electricity. Construction of the dam started on September 1991 and was completed on December 26, 1999.

Administrative divisions

Economy
Panzhihua is a highly industrialized area dominated by gigantic mining operations. Most of the land not in use for mining is taken up by subsistence farming.

Mineral Resources
Panzhihua has abundant natural resources, but remained undeveloped until 1960. It was founded on a remote headwater of the Yangtze River in 1966 as a steel production center. It grew rapidly as it remained relatively prosperous while the rest of the country suffered under the Cultural Revolution. The city is home to the Panzhihua Iron and Steel (Group) Co, called "Pangang ", the leading steel company in southwest China.

Proven iron ore (mainly vanadium-titanium magnetite) reserves are 73.8 million tons, 72.3% of the provincial total. At the end of 2007, the city's reserves of vanadium-titanium magnetite were 6.694 billion tons, of which: titanium reserves were 425 million tons, 93% of the national total, the world's largest; vanadium reserves were 10.38 million tons, 63% in the nation, third in the world. Cobalt reserves were 746 million tons. Other minerals were chromium, gallium, scandium, nickel, copper, lead, zinc, manganese, platinum and other rare metals.

Transport
Panzhihua is served by the Chengdu–Kunming Railway and the Panzhihua Bao'anying Airport. The city has over 10 bridges over the Jinsha River.

Education
Panzhihua University
The city's top high schools are the No.3 Panzhihua high school (located downtown) and the no.7 high school (located in the western district (Qingxiangping))

References

External links

 
Populated places on the Yangtze River
Cities in Sichuan
Prefecture-level divisions of Sichuan